Phloeophila peperomioides is a species of orchid plant native to Belize and Costa Rica.

References 

Pleurothallidinae
Flora of Costa Rica
Orchids of Central America
Orchids of Belize